Long Range Reconnaissance Escadrille (Eskadry Dalekiego Rozpoznania) was a unit of the Naval Air Squadron (Polish Morski Dywizjon Lotniczy) at the beginning of world war 2.

Air Crew 
Commander: kpt. mar. pil. Roman Borowiec

Equipment  
2 Lublin R-VIIIter floatplanes and 1 CANT Z.506B

See also
Polish Air Force order of battle in 1939

References
 

Polish Air Force escadrilles